Jasmine Cheung Shuk-han is a Hong Kong rugby union player. She was selected in Hong Kong's historic squad who made their first Rugby World Cup appearance in 2017.

Biography 
Cheung was named in Hong Kong's squad that toured Spain in a two-test match series in Madrid in 2015. She featured for her club the HKRU Scorpions against a touring Princeton A team at King's Park, in Hong Kong. Her team scored ten tries to win 58–17. She was named in Hong Kong's training squad in preparation for their Rugby World Cup qualifiers matches against Fiji and Japan in 2016. She also featured in two training games against Kazakhstan as part of their preparation.

Cheung was called again into the national team for the 2019 Asia Pacific Championship against Fiji and Samoa.

References 

Living people
Hong Kong people
Hong Kong rugby union players
Hong Kong female rugby union players
Year of birth missing (living people)